Lieutenant-General Montagu Brocas Burrows CB DSO MC (31 October 1894 – 17 January 1967) was a British Army officer who served in both world wars and became Commander-in-Chief (C-in-C) of West Africa Command from 1945 to 1946.

Early life
Montagu Brocas Burrows was born on 31 October 1894 in Reigate, Surrey, the son of Stephen Montagu Burrows and Isabella Christina née Cruickshank. He was educated at Eton College and Oxford University.

Military career
Burrows was commissioned as a second lieutenant into the 5th Dragoon Guards, British Army. He served in the First World War and became a prisoner of war during the Great Retreat.

He was deployed to the Murmansk coast with the North Russia Expeditionary Force during the Russian Civil War in 1918. In the 1920s he played cricket for Surrey County Cricket Club.

He remained in the army and continued to serve during the interwar period; he became adjutant at Oxford University Officers' Training Corps (OTC) in 1920 and an instructor at the Royal Military College, Sandhurst in 1922. After attending the Staff College, Camberley from 1925 to 1926, he became brigade major with the Nowshera Infantry Brigade in India in 1928 and then joined the 1st Cavalry Brigade at Aldershot in 1930. He was on the General Staff at the War Office from 1935 to 1938 when he became the military attaché in Rome.

He also served in the Second World War, initially still as a military attaché in Italy, before returning to the United Kingdom in May 1940 and, after being promoted to the acting rank of brigadier, was given command of the 1st Motor Machine Gun Brigade, which became the 26th Armoured Brigade in October. Soon afterwards, he became General Officer Commanding (GOC) of the newly raised 9th Armoured Division, for which he was promoted to acting major-general on 1 December 1940. He remained in command of the division until March 1942 when he was succeeded by Major-General Brian Horrocks. During this period he led Brocforce comprising the 9th Battalion, East Surrey Regiment, two companies of artillery and a Pioneer battalion. After becoming GOC of the 2nd Armoured Group in South-Eastern Command, he was subsequently GOC 11th Armoured Division from October 1942 to December 1943 before being appointed Head of the British Military Mission to the Soviet Union in 1944.

After the war he became General Officer Commanding-in-Chief (GOC-in-C) of West Africa Command; he retired in 1946.

Death
Burrows died on 17 January 1967 in Marylebone, London.

References

Bibliography

External links
Generals of World War

|-

|-

|-
 

1894 births
1967 deaths
5th Dragoon Guards officers
5th Royal Inniskilling Dragoon Guards officers
Academics of the Royal Military College, Sandhurst
British Army generals of World War II
British Army personnel of World War I
British World War I prisoners of war
Companions of the Distinguished Service Order
Companions of the Order of the Bath
Graduates of the Staff College, Camberley
Marylebone Cricket Club cricketers
People educated at Eton College
People from Reigate
Recipients of the Military Cross
Surrey cricketers
World War I prisoners of war held by Germany
Oxfordshire cricketers
Combined Services cricketers
Free Foresters cricketers
British Army cricketers
English cricketers
Oxford University cricketers
British Army lieutenant generals
British military attachés
British Army personnel of the Russian Civil War
Military personnel from Surrey